Kamal Mokdad is the General Manager of Banque Centrale Populaire of Morocco.

He was the former Managing partner and financial services leader at an international audit firm in Morocco from 2010 to 2016.

On June 18, 2020, he was appointed Chairman of the Board of Directors of the Casablanca Stock Exchange.

Current function 
Kamal Mokdad is the General Manager of the leading panafrican banking group Banque Centrale Populaire, headquartered in Morocco. He is also the head of International Global Banking and the CEO of “BCP Consulting”, a consulting firm owned 100% by BCP, created to enable the group’s execution of current strategic and operational projects, mainly on the international front.
He acts as Director on the board of many financial institutions, in Morocco, France, Italy and Subsaharan-Africa.

Kamal joined BCP’s executive management after an extensive international experience in audit and advisory across France, Morocco and Sub-Saharan Africa.

Early life and education 
Born and raised in Meknes, Kamal Mokdad pursued his studies at the Institute of Political Studies in Paris (Sciences Po Paris) where he earned a degree in economics and finance, as well as an international certificate of political studies. He also received the designation of chartered accountant in 2006 and holds an MBA obtained in 2014.

Professional career 
In 1998, Kamal Mokdad debuted his career in Paris at Mazars. In 2007, he was appointed as a Partner in Mazars Moroccan office and was in charge of leading the transition from the firm founding partner as well as launching a new Financial Services offer. In 2006, he was appointed as a partner and then was in charge of launching a new "Financial Services" offer in Morocco. By 2010, he was entrusted with the management of the firm as he became Morocco's managing partner and financial services leader in Africa. By 2010, he became Mazars' managing partner for Morocco.

By early 2017, he was nominated general manager at Banque Centrale Populaire. He is currently General Manager of BCP in Morocco and in charge of developing BCP abroad.

In early 2019, Kamal Mokdad is indeed entrusted, in addition to the International Banking, Moroccan activities of Banque Centrale Populaire.

On June 18, 2020, he was appointed Chairman of the Board of Directors of the Casablanca Stock Exchange.

African experience 
Given his experience in the African continent, Kamal Mokdad is considered a specialist of Africa.

Mandates 
Kamal Mokdad is the chairman of the board of different banks and insurance companies belonging to the BCP group in Africa.

He is also a Director on the Board of many financial institutions in Morocco, France, Italy and sub-Saharan Africa.

Distinctions 

 2017 : He was identified by the New African magazine among the most influential personalities of the year 2017 in Africa.
 2018 : In addition, BCP's acquisition of the 4 African banking subsidiaries of the French BPCE group, led by Mr. Kamal Mokdad, was voted "Deal of the Year" by the 2018 edition of the "Financial Afrik Awards" in Abidjan.
 2020 : For the second time, he is in the Financial Afrik's list of the most influential people that transforms Africa. Other personalities include mustpha terrab and Othman benhelloun
2021 : In his 2021 edition of the TOP CEOs of the Middle East Ranking, the Magazine Forbes Middle East ranked M Kamal Mokdad in the 62d position.
2021 : In the 2021 edition of the Financial Afrik Award, M Kamal Mokdad was nominated as « Financial person of the Year »

References 

Living people
Moroccan business executives
1974 births